St. Ephrem Ecumenical Research Institute (SEERI) is a centre for Syriac studies located in Kottayam, Kerala. It is a research centre of the Mahatma Gandhi University, Kottayam,

History 
Named after the Syriac saint, Ephrem the Syrian, SEERI  was inaugurated on 14 September 1985 by Marthoma Mathews I, Catholicos of the Malankara Orthodox Syrian Church. It works in collaboration with various churches that share the Syriac patrimony to foster ecumenism and deepen the mutual understanding of these churches in the study and search of their common heritage. It is sponsored and supported by the Archeparchy of Tiruvalla of the Syro-Malankara Catholic Church.

SEERI was developed to be a place for the advanced teaching and learning of the Syriac language and heritage in India, as well as making available manuscripts, documents, and source books necessary for such study and research.

Affiliations 
SEERI is a research center of the Mahatma Gandhi and  affiliated with the Catholic University of America

Administration

Presidents and Director 
President is Thomas Mor Koorilos, Metropolitan Archbishop of Tiruvalla

Director is Jacob Thekkeparambil

Notable faculty 
Rev. Dr. Baby Varghese

Rev. Dr. Jacob Thekeparampil (Director)

Rev. Fr. John Kannanthanam

Rev. Dr. Johns Abraham Konat

Dr. Kuriakose Valavanolickal

Rev. Fr. Kuriakose Moolayil Corepiscopa

Rev. Fr. Mathew Kuttiani

Rev. Fr. Raju Parakkott (Asst. Director)

Rev. Dr. Sebastian Naduthadom

Rev. Dr. Stephen Plathottathil OIC

Rev. Dr. Thomas Koonammakkal (Dean of Studies)

Rev. Fr. Varghese Varghese, Kaloor

Publications 
The HARP: (English Periodical) A review of Syriac, Ecumenical and Oriental Studies. Contains articles of renowned writers from all over           the world.

MŌRĀN ETH'Ō:(Monograph - occasional English Publication).

S.C.C: (SEERI Correspondence Course in English on Syrian Christian heritage. Complete set includes 12 books. The course is to be completed in two years. 9 books have already been published).

Blue Series: German translations of Syriac Liturgical text.

Madrōsō: (Malayalam)

Nuhro:  (Malayalam)

AWSĀR  SLAWŌTâ€™O (Translations from Syriac to English)

References

External links 
Syro-Malankara Catholic Church
SEERI homepage

Research institutes in Kerala
Catholic universities and colleges in India
Universities and colleges in Kottayam
Research institutes established in 1985
1985 establishments in Kerala